John Lloyd and Wendy Turnbull were the two-time defending champions but lost in the quarterfinals to Mark Edmondson and Kathy Jordan.

Paul McNamee and Martina Navratilova defeated John Fitzgerald and Elizabeth Smylie in the final, 7–5, 4–6, 6–2 to win the mixed doubles tennis title at the 1985 Wimbledon Championships. Due to bad weather, the Mixed Doubles tournament became delayed and after McNamee and Navratilova won their semifinal match against Scott Davis and Betsy Nagelsen, ending 23–21 in the final set on a match played on Court 2, the team remained on court with only a thirty minute rest interval to play the final on the same court.

Seeds

  John Lloyd /  Wendy Turnbull (quarterfinals)
  Paul McNamee /  Martina Navratilova (champions)
  Robert Seguso /  Anne Hobbs (second round, withdrew)
  Pavel Složil /  Helena Suková (quarterfinals)
  Steve Denton /  Jo Durie (quarterfinals)
  Mark Edmondson /  Kathy Jordan (semifinals)
  John Fitzgerald /  Elizabeth Smylie (final)
  Scott Davis /  Betsy Nagelsen (semifinals)

Draw

Finals

Top half

Section 1

Section 2

Bottom half

Section 3

Section 4

References

External links

1985 Wimbledon Championships – Doubles draws and results at the International Tennis Federation

X=Mixed Doubles
Wimbledon Championship by year – Mixed doubles